Derr Run is a tributary of Little Muncy Creek in Lycoming County, Pennsylvania, in the United States. It is classified as a Coldwater Fishery and a Migratory Fishery.

Course

Derr Run begins in a small pond on a hill in Penn Township. It flows south for several tenths of a mile and enters a valley before turning south-southeast. After several tenths of a mile, the stream turns south for a few tenths of a mile before turning south-southeast again and entering Penn Township. Several tenths of a mile further downstream, it turns southeast for several tenths of a mile. The stream then leaves its valley, crosses Pennsylvania Route 118, and turns southwest, flowing through the valley of Little Muncy Creek. After a few tenths of a mile, it reaches its confluence with Little Muncy Creek.

Geography and geology

There is a spring in the watershed of Derr Run.

Watershed and biology
The mouth of the stream is in the United States Geological Survey quadrangle of Lairdsville. However, its source is in the quadrangle of Picture Rocks. The mouth of the stream is located within  of Lairdsville.

In 2014, Waste Management of Pennsylvania, Inc. was issued an Erosion and Sediment Control Permit for which the receiving waterbody is Derr Run. However, one of the crossings of Derr Run was planned to involve no impact to the stream; the other was planned to impact .

Derr Run is classified as a Coldwater Fishery and a Migratory Fishery, as are all of the other named tributaries of Little Muncy Creek.

History
Derr Run was entered into the Geographic Names Information System on August 2, 1979. Its identifier in the Geographic Names Information System is 1192351.

See also
Jakes Run (Little Muncy Creek), next tributary of Little Muncy Creek going downstream
Big Run (Little Muncy Creek), next tributary of Little Muncy Creek going upstream
List of rivers of Pennsylvania

References

Rivers of Lycoming County, Pennsylvania
Tributaries of Muncy Creek
Rivers of Pennsylvania